Sean Gan Giannelli (born 31 October 1996) is a   Malaysian professional footballer who plays as a midfielder or forward for Kuala Lumpur City in the Malaysia Super League. Besides Malaysia, he has played in Italy.

Club career

In 2012, Giannelli joined the youth academy of Italian fourth division side Arezzo, where he received interest from the youth academy of Milan, one of the most successful clubs in Italy.

Before the 2020 season, he signed for Malaysian club Kuala Lumpur City after playing for youth academy of Johor Darul Ta'zim, the mosts successful team in Malaysia.

On 18 May 2021, Giannelli joined Malaysia Super League club UiTM on loan.

In 2022, he signed for Sri Pahang.

Career statistics

Club

References

External links
 

Malaysian people of Italian descent
Living people
Malaysia Super League players
Malaysian footballers
1996 births
Association football midfielders
Kuala Lumpur City F.C. players
Association football forwards